Kohl's Fountain is a fountain installed in the second courtyard of Prague Castle in Prague, Czech Republic.

External links

 

Fountains in the Czech Republic
Outdoor sculptures in Prague
Prague Castle